Mammillaria polythele is a cactus in the genus Mammillaria, native to Mexico.

Solitary plants are cylindrical, with erect stem to about 24 inches (61 centimeter) high and 3 to 4 inches (7.6 to 10.16 centimeter) in diameter. The color is dark green to blue green.

References
 Mammillarias.net page on M. polythele. Accessed 2 May 2009.

polythele
Cacti of Mexico
Garden plants of North America